Kajuluru mandal is one of the 21 mandals in Kakinada district of the state of Andhra Pradesh, India. It has its headquarters at Kajuluru town. The mandal is bounded by Ramachandrapuram, Karapa, Thallarevu and Pamarru mandals.

Demographics 

 census, the mandal had a population of 70,903. The total population constitute, 35,825 males and 35,078 females —a sex ratio of 979 females per 1000 males. 7,331 children are in the age group of 0–6 years, of which 3,744 are boys and 3,587 are girls —a ratio of 958 per 1000. The average literacy rate stands at 69.04% with 43,890 literates. Kajuluru is the most populated village and Tanumalla is the least populated village in the mandal.

Villages 

Kajuluru mandal consists of 26 villages. The following are the list of villages in the mandal:

Sources:
Census India 2011 (sub districts)
 Revenue Department of AP

References

Mandals in Kakinada district
Mandals in Andhra Pradesh